The following are the winners of the 41st annual (2014) Origins Award, presented at Origins 2015:

Fan Favorites

Vanguard Award Winners

References

External links
 2014 Origins Awards Winners and Nominees
 ICv2 – 2015 Origins Award Winners

2014 awards
 
2014 awards in the United States